The Painting of Osvaldo Mars (Italian: Il quadro di Osvaldo Mars) is a 1921 Italian silent drama film directed by Guido Brignone and starring Mercedes Brignone, Domenico Serra and Giovanni Cimara.

Synopsis
A countess, discovering that a painting of her provocatively dressed as Salome by the artist Osvaldo Mars is to be publicly exhibited, slashes the canvas. When he is found dead soon afterwards she is suspected of his murder.

Cast
 Mercedes Brignone as Contessa Anna Maria di San Giusto 
 Domenico Serra as Osvaldo Mars, il pittore 
 Giovanni Cimara as Conte di San Giusto 
 François-Paul Donadio as Cameriere 
 Armand Pouget as Ispettore Rull

References

Bibliography 
 Ágnes Pethő. The Cinema of Sensations. Cambridge Scholars Publishing, 2015.

External links 
 

1921 films
1921 drama films
Italian drama films
Italian silent feature films
1920s Italian-language films
Films directed by Guido Brignone
Italian black-and-white films
Silent drama films
1920s Italian films